Naturalism may refer to:

 Realism (arts), naturalism in the arts
 Naturalism (literature), a literary movement beginning in the late 19th century
 Naturalism (theatre), a movement in European drama and theatre
 Naturalism (philosophy), the idea that only natural laws and forces operate in the universe
 Naturalism (horse) (1988–2018), a racehorse

See also 
 
 Naturalness (disambiguation)
 Naturism (disambiguation)
 Natural history, a domain of inquiry involving organisms
 Naturalist, a person who studies natural history
 Naturalistic fallacy, the mistake of explaining something as being good reductively, in terms of natural properties
 Naturalistic observation, a research methodology
 Critical naturalism, an idea of Roy Bhaskar
 Ethical naturalism, or moral naturalism or naturalistic cognitivistic definism
 Humanistic naturalism, a branch of philosophical naturalism
 Liberal naturalism, a heterodox form of philosophical naturalism
 Metaphysical naturalism, a philosophical basis for science
 Poetic naturalism, an approach of Sean M. Carroll
 Political naturalism, a belief that there is a natural law
 Religious naturalism, combines a naturalist worldview with ideals associated with many religions
 Sociological naturalism, the view that the natural world and the social world are roughly identical
 Spiritual naturalism, combines a naturalist approach to spiritual ways of looking at the world